Jack McGee (1885 – June 13, 1918) was a pioneer aviator.

Biography
McGee was born in 1885 in Central Falls, Rhode Island to Robert McGee. His family moved to Pawtucket, Rhode Island when he was 15 in 1900. He was a boxer and worked as an elevator operator and auto mechanic before working as a chauffeur for James C. McCoy. McGee took flying lessons from Harry Atwood and Arch Freeman at Atwood Park in Saugus, Massachusetts. The school closed before McGee could finish his training, but he believed that he had received enough instruction and purchased his own plane. He made his first solo flight in August 1912. In 1917, McGee went to work as a test pilot for the Gallaudet Aircraft Corporation.

On June 13, 1918 he was flying a floatplane low over Greenwich Bay when his pontoon dipped into the water, causing his plane to topple into the water where he drowned.

Archive
His papers are archived at the Rhode Island Historical Society.

References

Aviation pioneers
1885 births
1918 deaths
Deaths by drowning in the United States
American aviators
Aviators from Rhode Island
Aviators killed in aviation accidents or incidents in the United States
Accidental deaths in Rhode Island
Aviation history of the United States
People from Pawtucket, Rhode Island
People from Central Falls, Rhode Island